Little Tupper Lake is a lake located by Whitney Headquarters, New York. Fish species present in the lake are brook trout, and sunfish. There is hand launch available at Whitney Headquarters.

References

Lakes of Hamilton County, New York
Lakes of New York (state)